Joseph Gormley   (1866–1950) was an American professional baseball player for the 1891 Philadelphia Phillies.

External links

1866 births
1950 deaths
Major League Baseball pitchers
Baseball players from Pennsylvania
Philadelphia Phillies players
19th-century baseball players
People from Carbon County, Pennsylvania